Strataes was a 1st-century Bishop of Smyrna.

He was the second bishop of Smyrna, replacing the Biblical character Saint Apelles, and he was reputed to have been a brother of the Biblical St Timothy. Tradition holds that he was martyred.

References

Saints from Roman Anatolia
Eastern Orthodox bishops of Smyrna
1st-century bishops in Roman Anatolia
Early Jewish Christians
1st-century Christian saints
Saints from the Holy Land